Coop & Cami Ask the World is an American comedy television series created by Boyce Bugliari and Jamie McLaughlin that premiered on Disney Channel on October 12, 2018. It stars Dakota Lotus and Ruby Rose Turner as Coop and Cami Wrather, two middle school-aged siblings who crowdsource their decision-making online, with Olivia Sanabia, Albert Tsai, Paxton Booth, and Rebecca Metz also starring. The series ran for two seasons, airing its final episode on September 11, 2020.

Series overview

Episodes

Season 1 (2018–19)

Season 2 (2019–20)

References 

Lists of American children's television series episodes
Lists of American comedy television series episodes
Lists of Disney Channel television series episodes